J. Franklin Ewing (October 14, 1905 - May 21, 1968) was an American Catholic priest and anthropologist and director of research services at Fordham University.

Ewing accepted the science of evolution but argued that God had a direct and primary role in the process.(29 November 1959). Priest-Scientist Disputes Huxley's View of Evolution, The Washington Star, p. 10 (noting that a speech by Ewing at a conference contrasted with that of Julian Huxley who also spoke)  Ewing was co-director of an archeological excavation at Ksar Akil in 1948 that unearthed a cranium from a 20,000 year old child that he named "Egbert".

Ewing became a faculty member at Fordham in 1949 as assistant professor of anthropology.

References

1905 births
1968 deaths
Regis High School (New York City) alumni
Woodstock College alumni
Fordham University faculty